Friend zone is a relationship where one person wishes to enter into a romantic or sexual relationship, while the other does not.

Friend zone or friendzone may also refer to:

 Friend Zone (film), a 2009 Spanish film 
 Friend Zone (song), a song by Danielle Bradbery
 Friend Zone (TV series), a 2018 Thai television series
 Friend Zone 2: Dangerous Area, a 2020 Thai television series and sequel
 Friendzone (TV series), a reality television series
 Friendzone (duo), an American musical duo
 Friendzone (film), a 2021 French film